Paul Schiff is an American film producer.

Early life and education
Schiff was raised in Bethesda, Maryland, one of three sons of Charlotte, a television and publishing executive, and Edward Schiff, a real estate lawyer. He graduated in film studies from Wesleyan University, where his roommate was actor Bradley Whitford.

Career
Schiff began his career as a documentary cameraman in his hometown of New York City before moving into directing for MTV, where he was on staff for four years during the early days of the fledgling cable channel. His success at the network led to an introduction to film executive Joe Roth, who would go on to become his mentor. Roth hired Schiff as associate producer on the boxing drama, Streets of Gold (1986), which was Roth's directorial debut, as well as his follow up Revenge of the Nerds II: Nerds in Paradise (1987). Schiff then became a vice president of production under Roth at Morgan Creek Productions, where he developed and supervised numerous projects, and co-produced the westerns Young Guns (1988) and its sequel, Young Guns II (1990). He also produced Roth's 1990 drama, Coupe de Ville.

After three years, Schiff secured an independent production deal at 20th Century Fox, where Roth was now Chairman. Schiff spent seven years at the studio in a production deal, where he produced films including My Cousin Vinny, starring Joe Pesci and Marisa Tomei, The Vanishing, the American adaptation of George Sluizer’s Dutch thriller; the Animal House-inspired campus comedy PCU; and the sci-fi thriller Ghost in the Machine.

After his stint at Fox, Schiff reteamed with Roth at Disney in a production deal, where he produced Wes Anderson's critically acclaimed film, Rushmore. The film won two Film Independent Spirit Awards—Best Director and Best Supporting Actor for Murray. Schiff continued his long-standing affiliation with Roth at the executive’s new production firm, Revolution Studios, where he produced Maid in Manhattan, the hit romantic comedy starring Jennifer Lopez and Ralph Fiennes, and Mike Newell’s drama Mona Lisa Smile, starring Julia Roberts, Julia Styles and Kirsten Dunst.

Schiff's producing credits also include The Air I Breathe, Numb, Green Street Hooligans, the 2004 remake of the 1970s classic actioner, Walking Tall, Solitary Man,  The Truth About Emmanuel, the ensemble comedy Spin, and the Alaskan-set thriller, Into the Grizzly Maze.

In 2015, Schiff completed My All American, an inspirational sports drama starring Aaron Eckhart and Robin Tunney.

Personal life
Schiff's brother is actor Richard Schiff. Schiff and his family are Jewish.

Filmography
He was a producer in all films unless otherwise noted.

Film

Second unit director or assistant director

As an actor

Soundtrack

Television

References

External links

American film producers
American Jews
American people of Jewish descent
Living people
People from Bethesda, Maryland
Wesleyan University alumni
Year of birth missing (living people)